Charles Diers (born 6 June 1981) is a French former professional footballer who played as a midfielder.

Career
In May 2016, it was announced that Diers would retire at the end of the 2015–16 season. Having joined Angers in 2008, he played a total of 266 matches for the club.

References

External links
 
 
 

1981 births
Living people
People from Cambrai
French footballers
Association football midfielders
AC Cambrai players
Lille OSC players
Dijon FCO players
US Boulogne players
Clermont Foot players
Angers SCO players
Ligue 2 players
Ligue 1 players
Sportspeople from Nord (French department)
Footballers from Hauts-de-France